The Cape Verdean Super Cup (Portuguese: Super Taça de Cabo Verde, Capeverdean Crioulo, ALUPEC or ALUPEK: Super Tasa di Kauberdi) is a Super Cup competition played during the season in Cape Verde.  The competition is governed by the Cape Verdean Football Federation (FCF). The national championship winner competes with the cup winner, in the 2014 edition, the 2013 super cup winner played with the 2014 national champion.  The first super cup competition began in 2013 which took place on 1 May and the last one took place in 2014 which took place on 30 April. The regional champion competes with the cup champion. Sometimes, if a champion also has a cup title, a cup club who is runner-up qualifies which never did. since 2017, it is the only competition of any level where a cup-runner up never competed.

Planning for the Super Cup began at the start of 2010 and scheduling was completed in 2012.

Only three clubs participated, CD Onze Unidos, Sporting Praia and CS Mindelense.  Sporting and Mindelense are the only Super Cup winners with each having a title. Sporting Praia was the only club who competed twice.  The only super cup goal was scored in the 2014 edition.

Unlike other competitions, all of its super cup matches took place at Estádio 5 de Julho in São Filipe in the island of Fogo.

Since 2015, no super cup competition has taken place as no Cape Verdean Cup took place due to scheduling problems.

Winners

See also
Cape Verdean Football Championships
Cape Verdean Cup

References

External links
 Cape Verdean Cup and Super Cup Winners - rsssf.com

Football cup competitions in Cape Verde
National association football supercups
2013 establishments in Cape Verde